The Sailor not the Sea is an album by the Belgian singer-songwriter Ozark Henry (stage name of Piet Goddaer), released in 2004. The album was awarded for double Platinum in Belgium (80.000 copies sold).

Track listing
 All songs written by Piet Goddaer, except "At Sea" by Goddaer and Joost Zwegers.
 "La Donna è Mobile" – 5:43
 "Indian Summer"  – 3:47
 "Jocelyn, It's Crazy We ain't Sixteen Anymore" – 5:39
 "Give Yourself a Chance With Me" – 4:12
 "Vespertine" – 4:46
 "At Sea" – 5:12
 "Free Haven" – 4:42
 "The Sailor not the Sea" – 6:18
 "Cry" – 5:32
 "April 4" – 5:02

2004 albums
Ozark Henry albums